Highway 7 is a highway in Iraq which extends from Al Kut to Nasiriyah.

Roads in Iraq